Prakasarao or Prakasa Rao (ప్రకాశరావు) is a masculine name commonly used in India.

 B. L. S. Prakasa Rao
 K. S. Prakash Rao
 Prakashrao Abitkar

Few habitats named after it:

 Prakasaraopalem
 Prakashraopeta

Masculine given names